"I Wonder What She's Doing Tonight" is a song written and originally recorded by Tommy Boyce and Bobby Hart (not to be confused with the Barry & the Tamerlanes song of the same title released in 1963).  The Boyce and Hart composition was arranged by Artie Butler. Entering the Billboard Hot 100 at #87 just before Christmas 1967, it became a true hit in 1968, reaching #7 on the Cash Box chart and #8 on the Billboard Hot 100 chart.  Marvin Stamm performs the trumpet solo and the recording notably features the voice of Tommy Boyce saying "Aww, come on now" in the second verse and "Alright, Bobby, let's give it to them" to Bobby Hart just before the third verse.

Boyce and Hart also recorded a version in French featuring the same instrumentation and verbal cues by Tommy Boyce.

Has the refrain of the 1966 Michel Polnareff song "La poupée que fait non" in the end of the song.

Other recorded versions
Gary Lewis and the Playboys on their 1968 album Gary Lewis Now!
Trini Lopez on his 1969 album The Whole Enchilada
Young Fresh Fellows on their 2001 album Because We Hate You
An instrumental is featured in the 1969 film Cactus Flower
The Explorers Club on the To Sing And Be Born Again album (2020)

References

1968 songs
1968 singles
A&M Records singles
Songs written by Bobby Hart
Songs written by Tommy Boyce
Song recordings produced by Tommy Boyce
Song recordings produced by Bobby Hart